Fady, Al Fady, or Fadey is an Arabic male given name meaning "redeemer, savior". Fady may refer to:

People
Fady Elsayed (born 1993), British actor
Fady Joudah (born 1971), Palestinian-American poet and physician
Fady Maalouf (born 1979), Lebanese-German pop singer
Fadey Sargsyan (1923–2010), Armenian scientist and politician
Faydee, stage name of Fady Fatrouni, Australian singer and songwriter of Lebanese origin

Other uses
Fady (taboo), a taboo in Malagasy culture

See also
Fadi, a given name

Arabic masculine given names